Garuiyeh may refer to:
 Garuiyeh, Bardsir